Wilfred is a masculine given name derived from Germanic roots meaning "will" and "peace" (like Old English wil and frið). The name was popular in the United Kingdom in the early twentieth century. Wilfried and its English spelling, Wilfrid, are closely related to Wilfred, with the same roots (Will and Frieden in German).

People named Wilfred
Wilfred the Hairy (died 897), a count in what is now Spain
Wilfred Baddeley (1872–1929), British tennis player
Wilfred Benítez (born 1958), Puerto Rican boxer
Wilfred Gordon Bigelow (1913–2005), Canadian heart surgeon
Wilfred Bion (1897–1979), British psychoanalyst
Wilfred Bouma (born 1978), Dutch footballer
Wilfred Bungei (born 1980), Kenyan middle-distance runner
Wilfred Burchett (1911–1983), Australian journalist
Wilfred de Soysa (1884–1968), Sri Lankan entrepreneur, landed proprietor, and philanthropist
Wilfred Edwards (disambiguation), multiple people
Wilfred Greatorex (1922–2002), English television and film writer, script editor and producer
Wilfred Grenfell (1865–1940), British medical missionary to Newfoundland and Labrador
Wilfred Iván Ojeda (1955–2011), Venezuelan journalist and politician
Wilfred Johnson (1935–1988), FBI informant against the Gambino organized crime family
Wilfred Lawrie Nicholas Johnson (born 2020), son of UK prime minister Boris Johnson
Wilfred Kitching (1893–1977), British, seventh General of the Salvation Army
Wilfred Ndidi, (born 1996), Nigerian football player
Wilfred Owen (1893–1918), British poet and soldier
Wilfred Pickles (1904–1978), English actor and radio presenter
Wilfred Potter (1910–1994), English cricketer
Wilfred A. Ratwatte, Sri Lankan Member of Parliament for Haputale
Wilfred Rhodes (1877–1973), English cricketer
Wilfred Rose (1922–2008), Trinidad and Tobago diplomat and politician
Wilfred Cantwell Smith (1916–2000), Canadian professor of comparative religion
Wilfred Stokes (1860–1927), British inventor of the Stokes mortar used in the First World War
Wilfred Thesiger (1910–2003), British explorer and travel writer
Wilfred Trotter (1872–1939), British surgeon, pioneer in neurosurgery and contributor to social psychology
Wilfred Wood (1897–1982), British First World War recipient of the Victoria Cross
Wilfred Wood (bishop) (born 1936), first black bishop in the Church of England

People named Wilfrid
Wilfrid (c. 634–709), originally spelled Wilfrith, Anglo-Saxon saint and Bishop of York 
Wilfrid (8th century bishop) or Saint Wilfrid the Younger (d. either 745 or 746), also an Anglo-Saxon saint and Bishop of York
Wilfrid Brambell (1912–1985), Irish actor
Wilfrid Wilson Gibson (1878–1962), British poet
Wilfrid de Glehn (1870–1951), British Impressionist painter
Wilfrid Hall (1892–1965), British entomologist
Wilfrid Kent Hughes (1895–1970), Australian soldier, Olympian and Olympic Games organiser, author and federal and state government minister
Wilfrid Hyde-White (1903–1991), English character actor
Wilfrid Laurier (1841–1919), seventh Prime Minister of Canada
Wilfrid Lawson (disambiguation), various baronets and one character actor
Wilfrid Wop May (1896–1952), Canadian First World War flying ace and aviation pioneer
Wilfrid Napier (born 1941), Roman Catholic cardinal and Archbishop of Durbin, South Africa
Wilfrid Noyce (1917–1962), English mountaineer and author
Wilfrid Pelletier (1896–1982), Canadian conductor, pianist, composer and administrator
Wilfred Martin Rajapakse (1864-19??), Sri Lankan lawyer and politician
Wilfrid Schroder (1946–2013), Associate Justice of the Kentucky Supreme Court
Wilfrid Sellars (1912–1989), American philosopher
Wilfred Senanayake (1918-2008), Sri Lankan Trotskyist MP for Homagama
Wilfrid Michael Voynich (1865–1930), Polish revolutionary, antiquarian and bibliophile
Wilfrid Wood (1888–1976), English artist

People named Wilfrith
Wilfrith I (bishop of Worcester) (died c. 744)
Wilfrith II (bishop of Worcester) (died 929)
Wilfrith Elstob (1888-1918), English First World War recipient of the Victoria Cross

Fictional characters
 Wilfrid, one of The Bash Street Kids
 Wilfred, one of the title characters of Pip, Squeak and Wilfred, a British newspaper strip cartoon (1919-1956)
 Wilfred, title character of Wilfred (Australian TV series) and its remake, Wilfred (U.S. TV series)
 Wilfred of Ivanhoe, the hero of Sir Walter Scott's novel Ivanhoe
Wilfred James, the protagonist of 1922
 Wilfred Mott, grandfather to Donna Noble, a companion to the tenth doctor in the TV show Doctor Who

See also
Wilfred (disambiguation)
Wilf
Wilfried (given name)

English masculine given names